Edorisi Master Ekhosuehi (born 20 May 1984 in Benin City) is a Nigerian footballer who currently plays for FC Locarno in the Swiss Challenge League.

Career 
Edo arrived Le Mans in summer 2005, signed a one-year contract. On 5 July 2006, he signed for Swiss French speaking side Yverdon-Sport.

References

External links
 
 
 

1984 births
Living people
Nigerian footballers
Nigerian expatriate footballers
Le Mans FC players
Ligue 1 players
Expatriate footballers in France
Expatriate footballers in Switzerland
Expatriate footballers in Saudi Arabia
Expatriate footballers in Tunisia
Association football forwards
Yverdon-Sport FC players
Al-Qadsiah FC players
CS Hammam-Lif players
FC Locarno players
Sportspeople from Benin City
Bendel Insurance F.C. players
Saudi Professional League players